Steven Jay Shelley (born June 23, 1962) is an American drummer. He is best known as the longtime drummer of the alternative rock band Sonic Youth, for whom he played from 1985 until their 2011 disbandment.

Biography
Shelley was born in Midland, Michigan and played in several mid-Michigan bands, including Faith and Morals and Strange Fruit, and was among the original lineup of the punk band The Crucifucks. Since 1985, he has performed with the noise rock band Sonic Youth, when he replaced Bob Bert.

After leaving the Crucifucks, he moved to Manhattan with a friend, living in the apartment of Sonic Youth's Thurston Moore and Kim Gordon for dog sitting purposes while the band was in Europe. When the band returned, former drummer Bob Bert had left the band, and they hired Shelley as their drummer without an audition.

In 1992 he founded the independent record label Smells Like Records, based in Hoboken, New Jersey.

Along with friend and Two Dollar Guitar musician Tim Foljahn, he helped advance Cat Power's musical career, serving as drummer on her first three albums. He also produced Blonde Redhead's debut self-titled album in 1995 and Cat Power's What Would the Community Think? in 1996.
Steve was able to track down Lee Hazlewood in 1997 and secure permission to reissue five of the finest titles of the Hazlewood back catalog.
Smells Like Records also released a collection of standards recorded in 1997, which was the first new recording from Hazlewood released domestically in nearly two decades.
In 1998 Shelley played on the soundtrack of the film Velvet Goldmine as a member of Wylde Ratttz, along with The Stooges' Ron Asheton, Thurston Moore, Mike Watt, Don Fleming, Mark Arm of Mudhoney and Jim Dunbar.

Other significant work away from Sonic Youth includes recording and performing with an array of artists such as Christina Rosenvinge, Chris Lee, John Wolfington, Michael Powers, Michael Rother, Howe Gelb, and Enrique Morente. In 2007, Shelley recorded a number of tracks for the I'm Not There soundtrack with a supergroup called The Million Dollar Bashers, featuring Lee Ranaldo, Wilco guitarist Nels Cline, Television guitarist Tom Verlaine, Dylan bassist Tony Garnier, guitarist Smokey Hormel and keyboardist John Medeski.

In February 2009, Shelley spent a weekend in Chicago recording with Chris Connelly, Sanford Parker, and Jeremy Lemos. The results of this collaboration were released under the moniker The High Confessions by Relapse Records on July 20, 2010.

In 2010, Michael Rother played shows in Europe with Shelley and Tall Firs guitarist Aaron Mullan as Halogallo 2010. This group performs music "in the spirit of" NEU! including some tracks by Harmonia and from Michael Rother's solo albums. Other 2010 concert dates included the ATP New York 2010 music festival in Monticello, New York and Incubate 2010 in Tilburg, Netherlands.

His enthusiasm for the music of Daniel Johnston and Townes Van Zandt led to his appearances in the documentaries The Devil and Daniel Johnston and Be Here to Love Me.

Shelley is also in charge of operating Sonic Youth's own record labels, SYR and Goofin'. In 2010, he started a new label called Vampire Blues whose inaugural release was a 7" by Hallogallo 2010.

In 2011 he joined Disappears. In 2012, he left the band due to scheduling conflicts.

From 2014 to 2017, Shelley played the drums for Sun Kil Moon on the albums Benji, Universal Themes and Common as Light and Love Are Red Valleys of Blood. He also toured with Sun Kil Moon on select 2015 dates.

Non-Sonic Youth discography

References

External links

1962 births
Living people
American male drummers
American rock drummers
American entertainment industry businesspeople
Noise rock musicians
Maracas players
Musicians from Hoboken, New Jersey
People from Midland, Michigan
Sonic Youth members
American punk rock drummers
Record producers from Michigan
Musicians from Michigan
American alternative rock musicians
20th-century American drummers
Dim Stars members